Chittagong-4 is a constituency represented in the Jatiya Sangsad (National Parliament) of Bangladesh since 2014 by Didarul Alam of the Awami League.

Boundaries 
The constituency encompasses Sitakunda Upazila and Chittagong City Corporation wards 9 and 10.

History 
The constituency was created for the first general elections in newly independent Bangladesh, held in 1973.

Ahead of the 2014 general election, the Election Commission renumbered the seat for Sandwip Upazila from Chittagong-16 to Chittagong-3, bumping up by one the suffix of the former constituency of that name and the higher numbered constituencies in the district. Previously Chittagong-4 encompassed Bayazid Thana and Hathazari Upazila.

Members of Parliament 
Key

Elections

Elections in the 2010s

Elections in the 2000s

Elections in the 1990s

Notes

References

External links
 

Parliamentary constituencies in Bangladesh
Chittagong District